Bellevue High School, also known as Bellevue School, is a public high school located in Bellevue, Texas (USA). It is the sole high school in the Bellevue Independent School District. In 2015, the school was rated "Met Standard" by the Texas Education Agency.

Athletics
The Bellevue Eagles compete in the following sports:

Basketball
Cross Country
Golf
Tennis
Track and Field

References

External links 
 Official website

Public high schools in Texas
Schools in Clay County, Texas